Weißbach is a river of Thuringia, Germany. It is a left tributary of the Roda.

See also
List of rivers of Thuringia

Rivers of Thuringia
Rivers of Germany